Show Me Shorts is an international short film festival held in Auckland and other venues across New Zealand. It screens a selection of short films from New Zealand and around the world in cinemas nationwide each spring.

Each year approximately 60 top short films are selected and contend for awards. The festival awards are then presented to the top filmmakers at the opening night and awards ceremony in Auckland. Show Me Shorts is New Zealand's first Academy Awards-accredited festival, with the Best Film and Best International Film award winners becoming eligible for nomination for the Oscars.

The programme covers a diverse range of themes and subjects including documentary, sci-fi, horror, drama, animation and comedy. Since 2014, a music video competitive category has been included. There are a number of supporting events such as a lab for screenwriters and filmmaker talks for aspiring filmmakers that run as part of the festival.

History 
Show Me Shorts Film Festival Trust is a registered charitable trust founded in Auckland in 2006 by Gina Dellabarca, Tamara Liebman, Katrin Hagen and Kate Nicholson.

The first screenings took place at Auckland's Academy Cinema in November, 2006. The following year the festival expanded to a full week in Auckland, plus screenings in Wellington, Christchurch and Dunedin. More locations and venues have since been added to the circuit.

In 2013 Show Me Shorts gained Academy Awards-accreditation for their Best New Zealand Film Award, allowing the festival to provide a pathway to the Oscars for filmmakers. In 2016 the festival additionally acquired Academy Awards-accreditation for their Best International Film Award.

In 2014 the Opening Night and Awards Ceremony took place at The Civic in Auckland, which has since become a fixture for the festival.

Winners 2022

Winners 2021

Winners 2020

Winners 2019

Winners 2018

Winners 2017

Winners 2016

Winners 2015

Winners 2014

Winners 2013

Winners 2012

Winners 2011

Winners 2010

Winners 2009

Winners 2008

Winners 2007

Winners 2006

See also
List of film festivals

References

External links 
Official website

Short film festivals in New Zealand
Film competitions
Festivals in Auckland